The Stora Enso headquarters is an office building located in the Katajanokka neighbourhood of central Helsinki, Finland, completed in 1962. It is notable for having been designed by the Finnish architect Alvar Aalto.

Architecture

Aalto's design is outwardly simple — essentially a white, monolithic block. However, the design and proportions are carefully considered, and the building makes use of premium exterior materials such as Carrara marble, granite, copper and brass, as well as lavish interior design features.

The building is commonly referred to as the "Sugar Cube" (Finnish: Sokeripala), due to its shape and colour.

There are six storeys above ground, with the top floor being slightly recessed to form a roof terrace overlooking the harbour and market square. There are also two underground levels, one of which is used for car parking. Many of the internal walls are movable, allowing the layout to be reconfigured should the tenant's spatial needs change.

Controversy
The building is located in a prominent position by the city's central South Harbour (Finnish: Eteläsatama) and Market Square, adjacent to the Presidential Palace. It is considered by some an eyesore for the way it seems to clash with the neoclassical architecture of its immediate surroundings and the Uspenski Cathedral, and is regarded as one of the most controversial of Aalto's designs. It has at times been called "the ugliest building in Finland", the "most hated building" and "completely misplaced". Also construction of the building originally required the demolition of the palace-like Norrmén house designed by Theodor Höijer, which was criticised right from the start. 

In 2010, after many years of legal and political wrangling, the building was granted protected status, as originally proposed by Docomomo, on the basis of its architectural merits and the significance of Aalto's heritage. This means that the exterior appearance cannot be changed, and any refurbishment etc. works must use the same materials as the original design. The protection also extends to certain interior spaces, such as the entrance lobby, managing director's suite and boardroom.

Ownership and tenancy
The building was designed to serve as the head office of the then Enso-Gutzeit company, the current incarnation of which is Stora Enso. The building is still known to some as the "Enso Headquarters" or "Enso-Gutzeit headquarters".

In 2008, Stora Enso sold the building to the German property investment company Deka for approximately EUR 30 million, and has since leased back the property.

In 2019, it was announced that Stora Enso would be vacating the building and moving to a new headquarters to be built on an adjacent plot as part of a wider redevelopment of the Katajanokka quay, and due to be completed in 2023. Following an architectural contest, in June 2020, the design proposal "Spring" was announced as the winner.

References

External links
Enso-Gutzeit Co. Headquarters on Alvar Aalto Foundation
"Controversial and praised Sugar Cube" article with several images illustrating interior and exterior architecture

Buildings and structures in Helsinki
Alvar Aalto buildings
Modernist architecture in Finland
Office buildings completed in 1962
Corporate headquarters
Katajanokka